Dirty Little Girl may refer to:

"Dirty Little Girl", a 1973 song by Elton John from Goodbye Yellow Brick Road
"Dirty Little Girl", a 2009 song by Burn Halo from their self-titled debut